The Gününa küna, or sometimes, Puelche (Mapudungun: pwelche, "people of the east") are indigenous peoples living east of the Andes Mountains in Chile and Southwest Argentina. They spoke the Puelche language. The name "Puelche" was not native, but was given to them by the Mapuche. They were annihilated by plagues and epidemics in the late 18th century, with survivors merging into other groups such as the Mapuche, Het, and Tehuelche.

The Puelche are commemorated in the scientific name of a species of lizard, Liolaemus puelche, which is endemic to Mendoza Province, Argentina. Currently, there are efforts of revitalizing the language.

Sources
Thomas Falkner, Description of Patagonia and the adjoining parts of South America, Pugh, Hereford, 1774.
 Juan Ignatius Molina, The Geographical, Natural, and Civil History of Chili, Longman, Hurst, Rees, and Orme, London, 1809
Bruce G. Trigger, Wilcomb E. Washburn, Richard E. W. Adams,   The Cambridge History of the Native Peoples of the Americas, Vol III South America Part 2. ,  Cambridge University Press, 2000.

References

Mapuche groups
Indigenous peoples in Argentina
Indigenous peoples of the Southern Cone